The Grosvenor Centre is a shopping centre in the town centre of Northampton, England. Work started in 1972 and the building opened in 1976.

The two-level centre is located adjacent to Market Square, and is owned by Legal & General. In 2014 it underwent a £3 million refurbishment.

Location
The Grosvenor Centre is located on the site of a previous medieval monastery in the centre of Northampton. The centre is linked to both the Market Square and Abington Street. It has its own multi-storey car park and was formerly connected to the Greyfriars bus station. The North Gate bus station is just west of the shopping centre.

Stores
As of January 2023 stores located in the Grosvenor Centre include: Boots, New Look, Primark, The Entertainer, W H Smith, Superdrug, Superdry and Next.

Future
House of Fraser, unable to commit to a long-term lease, closed in March 2014, and was replaced by Next and Primark.

With the proposed closure of the adjacent Greyfriars bus station, the centre was due to expand over the reclaimed site. However, this proposal was terminated on the 14 July 2014, and the bus station site given back to Northampton Borough Council. L&G then announced a £3 million refurbishment of the centre, due for completion in September 2014, involving new entrance canopies, refurbished toilets, updated ceilings, lighting, flooring, lifts and signage.

The Grosvenor Centre spans over 320,000 square foot of retail, food and leisure space. The centre has more than 50 shops and eateries with an individual mix of stores and high street brands.

References

External links
Official Website

Shopping centres in Northamptonshire
Buildings and structures in Northamptonshire